The National Risk Register is a report first released by the Cabinet Office in August 2008 as part of the British government's National Security Strategy. It provides an official government assessment of significant potential risks to the United Kingdom. The National Risk Register has since been re-issued in 2010, 2012, 2013, 2015, 2017 and 2020.

Contents

The National Risk Register divides risks into four main categories: natural hazards, major accidents, societal risks, and malicious attacks. It evaluates a number of risks under each of these headings, rated by relative impact and likelihood, and discusses the measures currently in place to deal with each of these. 

It also discusses measures that can be put in place by both individuals and organizations to mitigate the effects of civil disruption.

External links 
National Risk Register of Civil Emergencies – 2008 edition
National Risk Register for Civil Emergencies – 2010 edition
National Risk Register for Civil Emergencies – 2012 update
National Risk Register for Civil Emergencies – 2013 edition
National Risk Register for Civil Emergencies – 2015 edition
National Risk Register of Civil Emergencies – 2017 edition  
 National Risk Register 2020
Cabinet Office (United Kingdom)
Civil defense
Emergency management in the United Kingdom
National security of the United Kingdom